The 1897 Nebraska Bugeaters football team represented the University of Nebraska in the 1897 college football season. The team was coached by second-year head coach Edward N. Robinson and played their home games at Antelope Field in Lincoln, Nebraska. They competed as members of the Western Interstate University Football Association.

NU went unbeaten in WIUFA play to claim its first outright conference title. Following the season, Robinson accepted the head coaching position at Brown, his alma mater.

Schedule

Coaching staff

Roster

Starters

Game summaries

at Iowa Agricultural

Nebraska was unable to keep pace with the Cyclones in the second-ever meeting between the schools. NU was not helped by strong winds that died down in the second half when it would have benefited the Bugeaters.

Tarkio

This was the first meeting between Nebraska and Tarkio, and also the first game ever played on campus at the University of Nebraska. On this day, the new field (later known as Antelope Field) was extremely muddy, and conditions were only marginally improved by pre-game efforts to make it playable. Nebraska dominated the game anyway, not allowing Tarkio to move the ball inside NU's 30-yard line.

Nebraska Wesleyan

When Nebraska Wesleyan arrived, it was unclear if the game would be played, as they did not have enough players to field a full team. A bid to have Wesleyan's head coach play, a solution often used in past years, was denied as against league rules. Wesleyan eventually resolved the problem by adding a local high school player to their roster for the day, and Nebraska agreed to shorten the game to two 15-minute halves. Wesleyan kept Nebraska off the scoreboard in the first half, but the undermatched visitors could not keep up in the second half.

Missouri

Nebraska scored four times in the first half in the WIUFA conference opener to put the game out of reach early on. The Bugeaters kept scoring in the second half to set new program records for points in a game and margin of victory in a 41–0 victory.

Kansas

Prior to kickoff, disagreement began over officiating representative selected by Kansas. The Bugeaters repeatedly protested calls, and a Kansas field kick that many spectators claimed missed the mark was ruled good; at this point Nebraska chose to play under protest. The continual disruptions delayed the game's progress, and it was eventually called on account of darkness following a lengthy Kansas argument about a late Nebraska touchdown. Nebraska won 10–5, and Kansas demanded a rematch, but it was never scheduled.

University of Kansas records suggest the final score of this game was a 6–5 Nebraska victory.

at Kansas City Medics

The death of a Commandant Jackson resulted in this game being canceled, though it is not clear which team or school he was associated with. The game was initially rescheduled for December 5 but was never played.

Iowa

Some sources indicate Iowa failed to follow league requirements prior to the start of the season, which disqualified them as participants; however, league standings from the time list Iowa as a full WIUFA participant in 1897. Nebraska managed a single touchdown against the Hawkeyes, which was enough to win the game 6–0. NU swept its conference opponents and claimed the first outright league title in program history.

References

Nebraska
Nebraska Cornhuskers football seasons
Nebraska Bugeaters football